Gelechia anomorcta is a moth of the family Gelechiidae. It is found in the Russian Far East and Japan.

References

Moths described in 1926
Gelechia